Van Eeghen Group is one of the oldest still functioning food producing companies in Amsterdam, Netherlands, founded in 1662.
It is a family business older than 200 years and is a member of the Henokiens association. The trading company Van Eeghen is also active under other names such as Van Eeghen International and Belegging- en Handelmaatschappij Van Eeghen.

Jacob van Eeghen was previously a merchant in Aardenburg, in State Flanders. Via Middelburg and Haarlem, the Protestant Van Eeghen family ends up in Amsterdam. Like his father and grandfather, he traded in wool and linen. Later also in products such as grain, herring and salt. Since 1969, the banking activities have been transferred to H. Oyens & Zonen under the name Oyens & Van Eeghen, now Bank Oyens & Van Eeghen. In 2014, he surrendered his banking license and continued as an investment firm.

The part of the group is the Van Eeghen Functional Ingredients company producing various vitamins, antioxidants, amino acids, nutritional supplements, natural botanical extracts etc.

See also 
Henokiens

References 

Article contains translated text from Van Eeghen Group on the French Wikipedia retrieved on 1 May 2017.

External links 

Flavor companies
Food and drink companies of the Netherlands
Companies established in 1662
Food and drink companies established in the 17th century
Henokiens companies
Dutch brands